Mahbub Kandi (also Romanized as Maḩbūb Kandī) is a village in Aslan Duz Rural District, Aslan Duz District, Parsabad County, Ardabil Province, Iran. At the 2006 census, its population was 620, in 110 families.

References 

Towns and villages in Parsabad County